Francis Pellerin (2 April 1915 - 30 August 1998) was a French sculptor.

Early life
Francis Pellerin was born on 2 April 1915 in Cancale. His father was a sailor. He graduated from the École des Beaux-Arts in Paris.

Career
Pellerin taught Sculpture at the École des Beaux-Arts in Rennes. He won the Prix de Rome in 1944. He designed a large sculpture in the Lycée Professionel Jean-Guéhenno in Vannes and another sculpture on the campus of the University of Western Brittany in Brest. He also designed furniture inside churches designed by architect Yves Perrin, like the Saint-Yves Church and the Saint-Benoit Church in Rennes.

Pellerin exhibited his work at the Galerie Hautefeuille and the Salon des Réalités Nouvelles in Paris.

Death and legacy
Pellerin died on 30 August 1998 in Rennes. His work was exhibited posthumously at the Museum of Fine Arts of Rennes in 2005.

References

1915 births
1998 deaths
People from Ille-et-Vilaine
École des Beaux-Arts alumni
20th-century French sculptors
French male sculptors
Prix de Rome for sculpture